Kirk Lake is a lake in Clearwater County, Minnesota, in the United States.

Kirk Lake was named for Thomas H. Kirk, a Minnesota historian and writer.

See also
List of lakes in Minnesota

References

Lakes of Minnesota
Lakes of Clearwater County, Minnesota